Sivrihisar is a village in the Güzelyurt District, Aksaray Province, Turkey. Its population is 145 (2021).

History 
Its name was likely Arianzus, or Arianzum in antiquity due to its proximity to the settlement, though this is not confirmed.
The village has had the same name since 1919.

Geography 
It is 51 km from Aksaray city center and 5 km from Güzelyurt town center.

Population

References

Villages in Güzelyurt District, Aksaray